Al-Chibayish is a town on the Euphrates River in Al-Chibayish District, Dhi Qar governorate, in southern Iraq. It is the capital of its eponymous district.

Al-Chibayish is inhabited primarily by Marsh Arabs of the Beni Isad tribe. Al-Chibayish has historically been an important hub for the Marsh Arab people and a traditional boat-building center for their mashoof canoes.

History
Al-Chibayish was the subject of a groundbreaking 1955 ethnographic study, Marsh Dwellers of the Euphrates Delta, by Iraqi anthropologist Shakir Mustafa Salim.

Al-Chibayish was home to about 11,000 people in 1955. Al-Chibayish's population dropped to less than 6,000 by 2003 as a result of Saddam Hussein's draining of the Mesopotamian Marshes and his associated campaign of violence against the Marsh Arabs, during which Al-Chibayish was attacked by military helicopters. However, the population recovered and quintupled between 2001 and 2009, when it reached an estimated 30,416 people.

References

Populated places in Dhi Qar Province
District capitals of Iraq
Marsh Arabs